Zango may refer to:

Zango (company), a former software company 
Zango, Nigeria, a town in Nigeria
Zango, Viana, a commune in Luanda, Angola
Zongo settlements, areas in West African towns populated mostly by settlers from Northern Sahel areas

See also
Zongo (disambiguation)